Gerard Murphy (born 25 March 1951) is an Irish Fine Gael politician who has served as a Cork County Councillor since May 2009. He previously served as a Teachta Dála (TD) for the Cork North-West constituency from 2002 to 2007.

Murphy was elected to the 29th Dail at the 2002 general election, ousting his Fine Gael running-mate, three-term TD Michael Creed. He was Fine Gael's deputy Spokesperson on Justice. He was previously a member of Cork County Council, to which he was elected in 1991. He lost his seat at the 2007 general election to his running-mate Michael Creed. Following his defeat, he ran for election to Seanad Éireann but was defeated. He was re-elected to Cork County Council for the Kanturk local electoral area at the 2009 local elections. He was returned again to Cork County Council at the 2014 local elections and the 2019 local elections.

References

 

1951 births
Living people
Fine Gael TDs
Members of the 29th Dáil
Politicians from County Cork
Local councillors in County Cork